Washington State Employees Credit Union (WSECU) is a not-for-profit financial cooperative and the second largest credit union in the state of  Washington. Those who live, work, worship or attend school in the state are welcome to join and have access to the low-cost financial products and services that a credit union is able to offer.

As a financial cooperative, WSECU is overseen by an all-volunteer Board of Directors and Supervisory Committee who are WSECU members elected by fellow members.

History
WSECU was founded in 1957 by 40 state employees. The charter was initially limited to employees of Local No. 443, but expanded in 1958 to include all state employees, Washington State Employees Association and the Washington Federation of State Employees and Credit Union Employees. In 2013, WSECU became a community-chartered credit union.

The credit union experienced steady growth over the next two decades and expanded with four new branches during the 1970s. A merger with Lewis County Employees Credit Union in 1984 established another branch, with two more added in that decade. In the 1990s, five more branches opened, including a cooperative branch with Twin Star Credit Union. Early in the millennial decade, the credit union further expanded with two additional branches while surpassing the $1 billion mark. In 2007, a milestone was reached when WSECU celebrated its 50th year of service. In 2009, WSECU opened its third and current headquarters building in downtown Olympia. The building was sustainably built and was awarded LEEDS Gold by the U.S. Green Building Council.

Headquartered in Thurston County, WSECU serves members throughout Washington state. Branches are located in Bellevue, Chehalis,  Everett, Lacey, Lakewood, Olympia, Seattle and Tumwater in western Washington; and Ellensburg, Medical Lake, Pullman, Spokane, Spokane Valley and Yakima in eastern Washington.

Community support programs
WSECU is a supporter of the communities it serves, providing sponsorships, financial support and employee volunteerism. In 2017 the credit union partnered with Hands On Children's Museum of Olympia to launch the Learning for All Initiative, helping to expand museum programs and offer free access to underserved families in Thurston County. Four percent of the annual net income is reserved for community give-back to local non-profits that fall within the credit union's three pillars of giving: Education, Self-sufficiency and Public Employees and Assets.

Scholarships 
WSECU scholarships are available to any WSECU member who is pursuing higher education and meets the qualifications. Annual scholarships are awarded to 29 recipients and are broken into two categories: two-year community colleges and four-year colleges and universities.

See also 

 Pennsylvania State Employees Credit Union
 State Employees Credit Union of Maryland
 State Employees Credit Union of New Mexico
 State Employees Credit Union (North Carolina)
 S.C. State Credit Union

References

External links 
 
 WSECU assets and statistics
 National Credit Union Administration
 Consumer Information for WSECU

Credit unions based in Washington (state)
Non-profit organizations based in Olympia, Washington
Organizations established in 1957